Teresa Llacuna i Puig (born 27 May 1935 in Igualada) is a Catalan classical pianist, the only daughter of poet .

Biography 

Besides recording a complete work by Manuel de Falla, Teresa Llacuna gave her name to an international piano competition and counted the pianist Pascal Gallet among her students.

Selected discography 
 Trois siècles de musique espagnole, Soder
 Intégrale de Falla, EMI Sony
 Récital Granados, EMI Sony
 Rondos à deux pianos, Chopin, EMI

References

External links 
 Teresa Llacuna on concours-piano-llacuna
 Conours international de piano Teresa Llacuna
 Laval and Llacuna play Chopin Rondo Op.73 (YouTube)

Spanish classical pianists
1935 births
People from Igualada
Living people
20th-century classical pianists
Spanish women pianists
21st-century classical pianists
Women classical pianists
20th-century women pianists
21st-century women pianists